Virginia station is a light rail station operated by Santa Clara Valley Transportation Authority (VTA).  Virginia station is served by the Blue Line of the VTA Light Rail system.

Virginia station is located in the median of State Route 87 just south of the Virginia Street overpass.  It is accessed either via a set of stairs on the south side of Virginia Street, or an elevator on the north side of Virginia Street.

References

External links 

Station information (Transit Unlimited)

Santa Clara Valley Transportation Authority light rail stations
Railway stations in San Jose, California
Railway stations in the United States opened in 1987
1987 establishments in California
Railway stations in highway medians